Ostretsovo is a rural locality (a village) in Staroselskoye Rural Settlement, Mezhdurechensky District, Vologda Oblast, Russia. The population was 85 as of 2002.

Geography 
Ostretsovo is located 26 km southwest of Shuyskoye (the district's administrative centre) by road. Artemyevo is the nearest rural locality.

References 

Rural localities in Mezhdurechensky District, Vologda Oblast